The following highways are numbered 584:

United States